Andrei Vasilyevich Mikheyev (born 1 July 1987) is a Russian former professional football player.

External links
 

1987 births
Sportspeople from Rostov-on-Don
Living people
Russian footballers
Russia youth international footballers
Russia national football B team footballers
FC Vityaz Podolsk players
FC Krasnodar players
Russian Premier League players
FC Ufa players
FC Salyut Belgorod players
FC Rotor Volgograd players
FC Taganrog players
FC Sakhalin Yuzhno-Sakhalinsk players
FC Armavir players
Association football midfielders
FC Saturn Ramenskoye players
FC Chayka Peschanokopskoye players